John Francis Doerfler (born November 2, 1964) is an American prelate of the Roman Catholic Church who has been serving as bishop of the Diocese of Marquette in Michigan since 2014.

Biography

Early life and education
John Doerfler was born on November 2, 1964, to Henry and Germaine Mancl Doerfler in Appleton, Wisconsin. He attended Appleton West High School and graduated in 1983. He earned a Bachelor of Philosophy degree and Bachelor of Classics degree at the College of St. Thomas in St. Paul, Minnesota in 1987.

Doerfler entered the seminary and was sent to the Pontifical Gregorian University in Rome, where he earned a Bachelor of Sacred Theology degree in 1990. In 1997, he was awarded a Licentiate in Canon Law from the Catholic University of America in Washington, D.C. Doerfler continued his studies at the Pontifical John Paul II Institute for Studies on Marriage and Family at Catholic University receiving his Licentiate in Sacred Theology and Doctor in Sacred Theology degrees (1999 and 2008).

Ordination and ministry
On July 13, 1991, Doerfler was ordained a priest by Bishop Robert Banks for the Diocese of Green Bay. His first assignment was as parochial vicar at St. John Nepomucene Parish in Little Chute, Wisconsin from 1991 to 1995.  He was later appointed defender of the bond for the diocesan tribunal and parochial vicar of St. Francis Xavier Cathedral Parish in Green Bay.   He also worked as assistant chancellor, judge for the tribunal, chancellor, and vicar general, posts he held from 2005 to 2013. Prior to his appointment as bishop of Marquette, he served as the chaplain to Legatus, a Catholic organization of lay business people, and a member of the diocesan College of Consultors. He eventually served as the vicar general.

In 2011, Doerfler stated in a lawsuit deposition that he destroyed records relating to possible sexual abuse crimes by priests in the diocese.  He said that the records were destroyed in accordance to federal privacy laws and as part of an initiative by Bishop David Ricken.

Bishop of Marquette
On December 17, 2013, Pope Francis appointed Doerfler as the bishop of the Diocese of Marquette. He was consecrated by Archbishop Allen Vigneron as diocese's thirteenth bishop on February 11, 2014. He succeeded Bishop Alexander Sample, who was appointed archbishop of Portland in Oregon.

See also

 Catholic Church hierarchy
 Catholic Church in the United States
 Historical list of the Catholic bishops of the United States
 List of Catholic bishops of the United States
 Lists of patriarchs, archbishops, and bishops

References

External links
Roman Catholic Diocese Of Marquette Official Site

Episcopal succession

1964 births
Living people
People from Appleton, Wisconsin
University of St. Thomas (Minnesota) alumni
Catholic University of America alumni
Pontifical Gregorian University alumni
Roman Catholic bishops of Marquette
21st-century Roman Catholic bishops in the United States
Roman Catholic Diocese of Green Bay
Catholics from Wisconsin
Bishops appointed by Pope Francis